Rocky is a 2008 Indian Kannada-language romantic drama film directed by S. K. Nagendra Urs and written by Vijay Chendoor. The film stars Yash and newcomer Bianca Desai along with Jai Jagadish, Ramesh Bhat and  Santhosh in other pivotal roles.

The film featured original score and soundtrack composed by Venkat-Narayan. Although an excellent musical original film with good music in which S. P. Balasubrahmanyam has sung a duet with Priyadarshini which was his last for the younger generation heroand also from this movie actor Yash got the name "Rocky Bhai".  "Rocky" met with negative response with most critics who tried to compare it to films from other languages.

Plot
Rocky (Yash) is a young college student raised in an unloving home.  Usha (Bianca Desai) comes from a loving home but lost her mother in death.  They meet on her first day of college and it is love at first sight for Rocky.  Usha agrees to be friends and Rocky hides his feelings for her.  One day he is dismayed to find that Usha has an overwhelming fan crush on a classical guitarist named Vishwas (Aryan). Thinking that he is helping Usha, Rocky tries to arrange for them to meet.  Vishwas makes this difficult for Rocky because he believes that he is being sent by the enemies of his don brother (Raju) to harass him.  Finally Rocky sees them together and is happy with his work until he realizes that Vishwas is starting to believe that he is in love with Usha.  The competition between the two increases until Usha herself realizes that she herself is actually in love with one of them.

Cast 
 Yash as Rocky
 Bianca Desai as Usha
 Santhosh Aryan as Vishwas the concert guitarist
 K. L. Thimmappa Raju as Nanda the don
 Jai Jagadish as Rocky's father
 Ramesh Bhat as Usha's father
 Padmaja Rao as Rocky's mother
 Karibasavaiah as the college principal
 Girija Lokesh
 M.N Lakshmi Devi as Ajji, Usha's grandmother
 Mithra as Rocky's sidekick Soda

Soundtrack 
The music was composed by Venkat-Narayan and the audio was sold on Skanda Audio label.

Reception

Critical response 

R G Vijayasarathy of Rediff.com scored the film at 1 out of 5 stars and wrote "Music director Venkat and Narayan score two strong numbers like Valla Vallare and the title song. Dialogue writer Vijay Chendur has written crisp dialogues. But the senseless story makes the film a failure.  Cameraman Sudhakar comes off good with his camera work". A critic from Bangalore Mirror wrote  "Yash gets a better film to work on next time. If it is a khichidi of other films Nagendra wants to direct, he better stick to his forte of editing. And please Nagendra, do not play those silly cameo roles".

References 

2008 films
2000s Kannada-language films
2008 romantic drama films
Indian romantic drama films